Julio César Cedillo is a Mexican-American actor, best known for the title role in the 2005 film The Three Burials of Melquiades Estrada.

Early life
Cedillo was born in Durango, Mexico in 1970, but grew up in Fort Worth, Texas.  In 1988, he graduated from Dunbar High School.

Career
Cedillo appeared in several television productions in the 1990s, including Wishbone as Travis Del Rio, Oakdale's Sports and Games store owner. He made his film debut in 2000 in All the Pretty Horses.  Other films include The Rookie, Serving Sara, The Life of David Gale, The Alamo, Cowboys & Aliens and Sicario.

Filmography 
 The Three Burials of Melquiades Estrada (2005)
In The Electric Mist (2009)
 Cowboys & Aliens (2011)
 Frontera (2014)
 Sicario (2015)
The Harder They Fall (2021)
Chocolate Lizards (TBA)

Video games
 The Terminator: Dawn of Fate - Kyle Reese
 Age of Empires II: The Conquerors Expansion
 Borderlands - Mordecai

Television

Wishbone (1997-1998) - Travis Del Rio
The Good Guys ("Hunches & Heists") (2010)
The Walking Dead (Lieutenant Welles, Season 3, Ep. 3) (2012)
Narcos: Mexico (Comandante Guillermo González Calderoni, 3 Episodes) (2018)

External links

1970 births
Male actors from Fort Worth, Texas
University of Texas at Arlington alumni
Living people
Mexican emigrants to the United States
21st-century American male actors
Male actors from Durango
American male television actors
American male film actors
American male actors of Mexican descent